Kadeem Frank Allen (born January 15, 1993) is an American professional basketball player for Hapoel Haifa of the Israeli Basketball Premier League. He was selected with the 53rd pick of the 2017 NBA draft by the Boston Celtics, and has played in the NBA for the Celtics and the New York Knicks.

High school
In high school he first played for Laney High School, and in his senior year he played guard for New Hanover High School in his hometown of Wilmington, North Carolina.

College career
Playing for Hutchinson Community College in Hutchinson, Kansas, Allen as a freshman averaged 17.3 points, 5.3 rebounds, 2.5 steals (tops in the Jayhawk Conference), and 3.9 assists (3rd) in 2012–13. As a sophomore he scored 25.9 points per game (second in the NJCAA), and had 5.9 assists and 2.3 steals per game. He was named Junior College Player of the Year in 2014 by both the NABC and NJCAA after being named the 2014 NJCAA Preseason Player of the Year by the Sporting News.

He competed in college for the Arizona Wildcats for his final two years. He averaged 9.8 points, 1.6 steals (4th in the Pac-12), and 4.0 rebounds per game in his senior campaign. As a senior, he was named second-team All-Pac-12 and to the All-Defensive team.

Professional career

Boston Celtics (2017–2018)
Allen was drafted by the Celtics in the 2017 NBA draft and signed the franchise's first two-way contract. Under the terms of the deal, he will split time between the Celtics and their G League affiliate, the Maine Red Claws.

On January 29, 2018, Allen was named the NBA G League Player of the Week following a 38 points per game over the prior week. It included a 46 point game against the Long Island Nets on January 23.

On February 2, 2018, Allen and teammate Jabari Bird were named to the Midseason All-NBA G League East Team after averaging 18.0 points, 5.9 rebounds, 5.0 assists, and 2.6 steals per game.

On July 15, 2018, Allen was waived by the Celtics.

Westchester Knicks (2018–2019)
Allen was signed by the New York Knicks on July 25, 2018. He was waived by the Knicks on October 13, 2018, but signed with their G League affiliate the Westchester Knicks for training camp.

New York Knicks (2019–2020) 
On January 14, 2019, Allen signed with the New York Knicks on a two-way contract. On June 25, 2020, the Knicks waived Allen.

JL Bourg (2020–2021)
On July 20, 2020, he signed with JL Bourg of LNB Pro A, with whom he averaged 9.6 points and 2.7 assists per game in EuroCup games 8.9 points and 2.5 assists per game in the domestic LNB league.

On January 25, 2021, Allen was included in the roster of the Canton Charge, but was later waived by the Charge on February 6, 2021.

Hapoel Haifa (2021–present)
On June 19, 2021, Allen signed with Hapoel Haifa of the Israeli Basketball Premier League.

Career statistics

NBA

Regular season

|-
| style="text-align:left;"|
| style="text-align:left;"|Boston
| 18 || 1 || 5.9 || .273 || .000 || .778 || .6 || .7 || .2 || .1 || 1.1
|-
| style="text-align:left;"|
| style="text-align:left;"|New York
| 19 || 1 || 21.9 || .461 || .472 || .778 || 2.7 || 4.0 || .8 || .2 || 9.9
|-
| style="text-align:left;"|
| style="text-align:left;"|New York
| 10 || 0 || 11.7 || .432 || .313 || .636 || .9 || 2.1 || .5 || .2 || 5.0
|- class="sortbottom"
| style="text-align:center;" colspan="2"|Career
| 47 || 2 || 13.6 || .435 || .349 || .757 || 1.5 || 2.3 || .5 || .2 || 5.5

College

|-
| style="text-align:left;"|2015–16
| style="text-align:left;"|Arizona
| 34 || 28 || 24.9 || .465 || .360 || .705 || 3.1 || 3.6 || 1.0 || .8 || 8.4
|-
| style="text-align:left;"|2016–17
| style="text-align:left;"|Arizona
| 34 || 33 || 30.0 || .453 || .427 || .741 || 4.0 || 3.0 || 1.6 || .6 || 9.8
|- class="sortbottom"
| style="text-align:center;" colspan="2"|Career
| 68 || 61 || 27.5 || .459 || .400 || .725 || 3.6 || 3.3 || 1.3 || .7 || 9.1

References

External links

 Arizona Wildcats bio

1993 births
Living people
American expatriate basketball people in France
American expatriate basketball people in Israel
American men's basketball players
Arizona Wildcats men's basketball players
Basketball players from North Carolina
Boston Celtics draft picks
Boston Celtics players
Hapoel Haifa B.C. players
Hutchinson Blue Dragons men's basketball players
Israeli Basketball Premier League players
JL Bourg-en-Bresse players
Maine Red Claws players
New Hanover High School alumni
New York Knicks players
Point guards
Sportspeople from Wilmington, North Carolina
Westchester Knicks players